Sao Seng Suk (1935 – 13 August 2007), also known as Khun Kyar Nu, was a Shan political and military leader.

Early life 
He was the sixth son of Shan leader Khun Kyaw Pu, who signed the Panglong Agreement in 1947.

Politician 
In 1959, he joined the Noom Suk Harn in 1960 and became the commander of the Shan State Army's third brigade.

He later became chairman and commander in chief of the Shan State Progress Party, Co-founded Shan State Organization, Co-founded Shan Democratic Union and was elected as first President of Shan State Constitutional Drafting Commission before becoming involved in the Ethnic Nationalities Council.

Death 
He died at a hospital in Chiang Mai, Thailand on 13 August 2007, aged 72 following a lengthy battle with lung disease.

Sao Seng Suk was survived by his wife, Nang Layen and three sons, a daughter

Sources 
Democratic Voice of Burma interview with U Shwe Ohn, who was involved in the Pang Long agreement.

External links 
DVB – Norway 
The Unrepresented Nations and Peoples Organization (UNPO)
Shan Land 

Burmese politicians
Deaths from lung disease
1935 births
2007 deaths
Burmese people of Shan descent